Manhean Senior High/Technical School is a coeducational second-cycle institution in Ghana, established in 1991.

Courses 
The school offers courses in Visual Arts, Agricultural Science, General Arts, Technical and Home Economics.

References 

High schools in Ghana
Educational institutions established in 1991
1991 establishments in Ghana